HMS Shamrock was an  destroyer, which served with the Royal Navy in the twentieth century. Launched on 26 August 1918 just before the end of the First World War, the ship was commissioned into the Home Fleet. A year later, the destroyer was sent to the Baltic Sea during the Russian Civil War to support Latvia, arriving just at the cessation of that country's war of independence. The vessel was later sent to join the Local Defence Flotilla at Gibraltar, being commissioned in 1934. It was while serving there that the destroyer helped evacuate civilians from Malaga at the start of the Spanish Civil War. Shamrock was retired soon after and sold to be broken up on 23 November 1936.

Design and development

Shamrock was one of thirty-three Admiralty  destroyers ordered by the British Admiralty in June 1917 as part of the Twelfth War Construction Programme.

Armament consisted of three QF  Mk IV guns on the ship's centreline.  One was mounted raised on the forecastle, one on a platform between the funnels and one aft. The ship also mounted a single  2-pounder pom-pom anti-aircraft gun for air defence. Four  torpedo tubes were fitted in two twin rotating mounts aft. The ship was designed to mount two additional  torpedo tubes either side of the superstructure but this required the forecastle plating to be cut away, making the vessel very wet, so they were removed. The weight saved enabled the heavier Mark V 21-inch torpedo to be carried. The ship had a complement of 90 officers and ratings.

Construction and career
Laid down in November 1917 by William Doxford & Sons at their dockyard in Sunderland, Shamrock was launched on 26 August the following year, shortly before the Armistice which ended the First World War. and was completed on 28 March 1919. The vessel was the fourth that served in the Royal Navy to bear the name. Shamrock was commissioned into the Fourth Destroyer Flotilla of the Home Fleet.

Although the war on the western front had finished, the escalating civil war in Russia continued. The United Kingdom decided to send units of the Royal Navy into the Baltic Sea to monitor the situation and to protect British interests. Soon into the campaign, it became clear that the Russians were planning to liberate the Baltic State of Latvia by integrating it into the new Soviet Union. The fleet was therefore tasked with not simply helping to help organise the evacuation of German forces from the country but also support their war of independence. This was achieved on 14 November 1919.

On 1 February 1934, the destroyer was recommissioned and joined the Local Defence Flotilla at Gibraltar. In 1936, with tensions escalating in Spain, Shamrock, was joined by five other destroyers and three cruisers, just before the start of the Spanish Civil War. The destroyer was involved in evacuating British, French and American citizens from Malaga, and then other smaller settlements. On 22 July, while undertaking these duties, the ship was bombed by Nationalist aircraft, but remained unharmed. Soon after,  Shamrock was taken out of service. The destroyer was chosen as one of twenty-two destroyers given to Thos. W. Ward of Sheffield in exchange for the liner . In consequence, on 23 November 1936, the ship was handed over to be broken up at Milford Haven.

Pennant numbers

References

Citations

Bibliography

 
 
 
 
 
 
 
 
 
 
 
 
 

1918 ships
Ships built on the River Clyde
S-class destroyers (1917) of the Royal Navy